Temnić is an area of Šumadija, which extends between the Velika Morava, the mountain of Juhor and the Western Morava in Serbia. It is bounded by the east from the Great Morava from the composition of the South and West Morava to the village of Trešnjevica. The western border is on the ridge of Juhor and Blagotin, from where through the village of Milutovac it reaches the Western Morava, which Temnić limits to the south.

See also

 Temnić inscription

References

Historical regions in Serbia
Šumadija District